The Hillside Memorial Park and Mortuary is a Jewish cemetery located at 6001 West Centinela Avenue, in Culver City, California. Many Jews from the entertainment industry are buried here. The cemetery is known for Al Jolson's elaborate tomb (designed by Los Angeles architect Paul Williams), a 75-foot-high pergola and monument atop a hill above a water cascade, all visible from the adjacent San Diego Freeway.

History
Built on 35 acres of rolling hills in an undeveloped area near Inglewood, the cemetery was originally founded as B'nai B'rith Memorial Park in 1941 by Lazare F. Bernhard and Robert S. and Harry Groman, founders of Groman Mortuaries in 1936 and sons of Charles Groman, who co-founded the first licensed Jewish mortuary west of Chicago, Glasband-Groman-Glasband, before it was renamed "Hillside Memorial Park" in 1942. Because of objections by the Inglewood Chamber of Commerce, they were not granted a permit to operate by the Los Angeles County Board of Supervisors until July 1943.

In 1951 the park became famous when Al Jolson's widow, Erle, purchased a large plot and had erected a 75-foot-high domed monument in his memory. Thousands attended the dedication and service, which included a eulogy by Jack Benny.

After a bitter legal dispute between the Groman brothers, and Robert's death in 1957, the park was acquired by Temple Israel of Hollywood, which continues to own and operate it.

Jack Benny's funeral in 1974 included a eulogy by Bob Hope and was attended by over 2000 people, including dozens of well-known members of the entertainment community. Major figures in the worlds of philanthropy, women's rights, law, education, medicine and religion are interred at Hillside, some of whom are listed below.

Notable interments
See also :Category:Burials at Hillside Memorial Park Cemetery

A

See also
 Cemeteries in Los Angeles County, California

References

External links
 Hillside Memorial Park official website
 
 Hillside Memorial Park: Famous names at Find a Grave

Jewish cemeteries in California
Cemeteries in Los Angeles County, California
1941 establishments in California
Buildings and structures in Culver City, California